"Who Cares?" is a song composed by George Gershwin, with lyrics by Ira Gershwin, written for their 1931 musical Of Thee I Sing. It was introduced by William Gaxton and Lois Moran in the original Broadway production.

Notable recordings 
Fred Astaire with Benny Goodman and his Orchestra - recorded May 9, 1940 for Columbia Records, catalog No. 35517.
Kate Smith - for her album Kate Smith (1954).
Anita O'Day - This Is Anita (1955)
Sammy Davis Jr. and Carmen McRae  - Boy Meets Girl (1957)
Ella Fitzgerald - Ella Fitzgerald Sings the George and Ira Gershwin Songbook (1959) and the 1983 Pablo release Nice Work if You Can Get It
Cannonball Adderley - Know What I Mean? (1961)
Judy Garland - Judy at Carnegie Hall (1961) Judy Garland - That’s Entertainment (1960) The Judy Garland Show (1963)
Michael Feinstein - Nice Work If You Can Get It: Songs by the Gershwins (1996)
Dick Haymes - For You, for Me, Forevermore (1978).
Tony Bennett - Steppin' Out (1993)
Susannah McCorkle - Someone to Watch Over Me—Songs of George Gershwin (1998).
Bea Arthur - Bea Arthur on Broadway — Just Between Friends (2002)
Rufus Wainwright - Rufus Does Judy at Carnegie Hall (2007)
Bill Evans - with Chuck Israels and Larry Bunker on the album Time Remembered

References 

Songs with music by George Gershwin
Songs with lyrics by Ira Gershwin
1931 songs
Fred Astaire songs
Benny Goodman songs